Caffe Cino was an Off-Off-Broadway theater founded in 1958 by Joe Cino. The West Village coffeehouse, located at 31 Cornelia Street, was initially conceived as a venue for poetry, folk music, and visual art exhibitions. The plays produced at the Cino, however, became most prominent, and it is now considered the "birthplace of Off-Off-Broadway".

Beginnings and early productions
Joe Cino was born into an Italian-American family, and moved from Buffalo, New York to be a dancer in New York City. After 10 years, he used his $400 in savings and opened the Caffe Cino Art Gallery. Initially, Cino encouraged his friends to hang their artwork on the walls. That led to poetry readings, which led to staged readings and eventually to productions of plays.

During the early days of the Cino, plays were produced on the floor. A makeshift 8x8-foot stage was later created using milk cartons and carpet remnants. Productions were initially limited to 30 minutes, and the audience could stand anywhere. The space was only 18x30-feet, and audience members often perched atop the cigarette machine. Admission was one dollar, and audience members were offered a coffee and an Italian pastry along with the show.

Fire and Cino's death 
On Ash Wednesday 1965, a fire destroyed the interior of the Cino. The building's structure was not affected. A new lighting system had been installed, along with the fireproofing of the Caffe's ceiling, which prevented the fire from spreading to the rest of the tenement building. The official cause of the fire was a gas leak, but some suspected that Cino's lover set the fire. The community raised money by staging benefit performances while the Caffe was closed for renovations. Ellen Stewart, founder of La MaMa Experimental Theatre Club, offered Cino and his staff a space to continue Caffe Cino productions on Sunday and Monday nights at her theater.

Joe Cino died three days after an attempted suicide in 1967. Some suspected that the attempt was due to the death of Cino's lover John Torrey and to his drug use.

Notable contributors
The Caffe Cino was an incubator for first-time directors, playwrights, actors, and lighting or set designers. Many continued to work in stage, screen, or both after the Cino closed. Notable contributors include:

 John Guare
 Sam Shepard
 Al Pacino
 Robert Dahdah
 Bernadette Peters 
 Robert Heide
 Bette Midler
 Johnny Dodd
 Doric Wilson
 Jean-Claude van Itallie
 Rosalyn Drexler
 Marshall W. Mason 
 Tom O'Horgan
 Magie Dominic
 Irene Fornes
 William Hoffman
 Tom Eyen
 Paul Foster
 Leonard Melfi
 Ondine
 H.M. Koutoukas
 David Starkweather
 Michael Warren Powell
 Mari-Claire Charba
 Robert Patrick
 Lanford Wilson
 Andy Milligan (playwright)

References

External links
Caffe Cino on La MaMa Archives Digital Collections
James Gossage photographs, 1965–1975 Billy Rose Theatre Division, New York Public Library for the Performing Arts
Robert Patrick papers, c. 1940–1984 Billy Rose Theatre Division, New York Public Library for the Performing Arts
 Lanford Wilson Collection at the University of Missouri Libraries

1958 establishments in New York City
Arts organizations established in 1958
Former theatres in Manhattan
Organizations disestablished in 1968
Off-Off-Broadway
West Village